Jack L. Wilson is a Judge of the Mississippi Court of Appeals.

Biography and career 

Wilson graduated from the University of Mississippi with a Bachelor of Accountancy degree and then earned his Juris Doctor from Harvard Law School in 2004.

After law school, he served as a law clerk to Judge Gerald Bard Tjoflat of the United States Court of Appeals for the Eleventh Circuit and worked at Mayer Brown in Washington, D.C. From 2009 to 2012, Wilson worked at Bradley Arant Boult Cummings. He also was an adjunct at the Mississippi College School of Law.

Wilson served as deputy general counsel to Governor of Mississippi Phil Bryant from 2012 to 2013, and then was co-chief counsel from 2013 to 2014. He then returned to Bradley Arant Boult Cummings as a counsel in the Jackson office, where he continued to work until receiving his judicial appointment.

In the past, Wilson served as president of the Mississippi Lawyers chapter of the Federalist Society and currently serves as a Commissioner of the Uniform Law Commission.

Judicial tenure 
Wilson was appointed by Governor Bryant, effective July 1, 2015, to the Mississippi Court of Appeals Position 1 seat that covered District 3. The seat was vacated by Larry Roberts, who retired earlier in the year and left a partial term expiring on January 1, 2017. Wilson ran for election in 2016. He won a nonpartisan election to a term that expires on January 5, 2025.

Electoral history 
2016

References

External links 
 

Living people

1970s births
21st-century American lawyers
21st-century American judges
Baptists from Mississippi
Federalist Society members
Harvard Law School alumni
Mississippi College School of Law faculty
Mississippi Court of Appeals judges
Mississippi lawyers
University of Mississippi alumni
Year of birth uncertain
Place of birth missing (living people)